An active-filter tuned oscillator is an active electronic circuit designed to produce a periodic signal. It consists of a bandpass filter and an active amplifier, such as an OP-AMP or a BJT. The oscillator is commonly tuned to a specific frequency by varying the reactant of the feedback path within the circuit. An example is the Colpitts oscillator.

Properties 

An oscillator is any device or system that produces a periodic output. In a tuned oscillator, the period of the output may be controlled by altering the system's resonant frequency. In the case of a tunable electronic oscillator, this is most commonly achieved by altering the circuit's capacitance.

As with all oscillators, active-filter tuned oscillators adhere to the Barkhausen stability criterion, which states that the open-loop gain Aβ must be equal or greater than one, which means magnitude Aβ ≥ 1 and the phase shift around the loop is zero or an integer multiple of 2π:  Whenever the criterion is satisfied the circuit starts to oscillate. To make the circuit oscillate at a certain frequency, a frequency selective circuit is made to satisfy the above criterion at a particular frequency. These circuits are called timing circuits of the oscillators.

References

External links 
 Operational Transconductance Amplifiers (OTA) for synthesis of voltage-controlled active-filter tuned oscillators by Dr. William R Grise
 El 303 Analog Integrated Circuits - Active Filter Design Oscillator Design homework assignment
 What is active filter tuned oscillator? A forum thread on Edaboard.com
 Oscillators by Edgar Sanchez-Sinencio
 Active Filters and Tuned Circuits
 ECTE 313 Electronics Part II, week 4 by Daniel Franklin
 Active Filters - Characteristics, Topologies and Examples
 Oscillator Circuits
 ELG4139: Oscillator Circuits

Electronic oscillators